John Bain (born 3 June 1957 in Falkirk, Scotland) is a Scottish retired-US soccer midfielder who currently coaches youth soccer in the United States. Bain began his professional career in England before moving to the United States in 1978. Over his twenty-year playing career, Bain played for numerous leagues and teams, both indoors and out. After retiring from playing professionally, he has coached at the professional, youth club and high school levels in the US.

Player
Although born in Scotland, Bain's father was a scout for the English club Bristol City. Bain signed with Bristol City in July 1974, but was unable to break into the first team. In 1976, Bristol loaned him to Brentford for the 1976/77 season. In 1978, Bristol transferred two players, defender Brian McNeill and John Bain to the Portland Timbers of the North American Soccer League. Before moving to the United States and joining the Timbers, Bain played on Scotland's U-18 and U-21 teams. He would never return to play in Britain or for the Scottish national teams. During five seasons with the Timbers, Bain became one of the team's all-time greatest players. He would go on to score 45 goals and assist on 55 others giving him the Timbers' record for career goals and assists. Additionally, he is in second place on the list of games played with 148. In addition to his outdoor success, Bain played in both the 1980–1981 and 1981–1982 NASL indoor seasons. In the 1980–1981 season, he scored 20 goals in 15 games. In the 1981–1982 NASL indoor season, his scoring pace dropped as he only bagged 8 goals in 18 games. The Timbers folded at the end of the 1982 outdoor season and the Seattle Sounders picked up Bain in the dispersal draft. He would play a single season with the Sounders, before they also folded. In 1984, he played with the Minnesota Strikers in the NASL's last season. When the NASL collapsed in 1984, the Strikers moved to the Major Indoor Soccer League (MISL). Bain played one season indoors with the Strikers, then moved to the Kansas City Comets, also of the MISL, for the next two seasons. In 1988, he played for the Ottawa Intrepid. In 1989, Bain returned to Portland as a player/coach for the new Portland Timbers of the Western Soccer League (WSL). This team had begun existence as F.C. Portland, but had reclaimed the name and heritage of the NASL Timbers for the 1989 season. Bain was selected to the league's first team All Star list that year. In 1990, the WSL merged with the American Soccer League to form the American Professional Soccer League (APSL). Bain remained with the team as a player/coach. At the end of the season, the Timbers owner, Art Dixon, folded the team after losing $500,000 over two years.

Coach

High school
Bain left playing and began full-time coaching. In 1991 and 1992, Bain led the Mountain View High School men's soccer team to back-to-back Washington State Championship Titles. In addition, Bain's Mountain View High School soccer team was recognised by USA Today as being the 6th best boys' soccer team in the nation.

Portland Pride
In 1993, Bain returned to Portland to become the first coach / player of the Portland Pride of the Continental Indoor Soccer League. He coached the team until 1996.

Youth coach
Beginning in 1995, Bain has coached various youth teams of the Westside Metros (also known as Westside Timbers) in Beaverton, Oregon. He also coached with the club in 1991 before moving to Washington State.

He married his wife Darcy when with the NASL Timbers. His son Brendon played for Las Vegas Strikers of the National Premier Soccer League.
He is currently married to Shannon Bain. They have three boys; Camelon, McEwan, and Stirling.

References

External links
 Seattle Sounders media guide write up on Bain
 Timbers Fan profile
 
 NASL/MISL stats

1957 births
Living people
American Professional Soccer League coaches
American soccer coaches
Brentford F.C. players
Bristol City F.C. players
Canadian Soccer League (1987–1992) players
Continental Indoor Soccer League coaches
Continental Indoor Soccer League players
Association football midfielders
Footballers from Falkirk
Expatriate soccer players in Canada
Expatriate soccer players in the United States
San Jose Earthquakes (1974–1988) players
Kansas City Comets (original MISL) players
Major Indoor Soccer League (1978–1992) players
Minnesota Strikers (NASL) players
North American Soccer League (1968–1984) players
North American Soccer League (1968–1984) indoor players
Portland Pride players
Portland Timbers (1975–1982) players
Portland Timbers (1985–1990) players
Portland Timbers (WSA/APSL) coaches
Scottish footballers
Scottish expatriate footballers
Scottish emigrants to the United States
Seattle Sounders (1974–1983) players
Tacoma Stars players
Western Soccer Alliance coaches
Western Soccer Alliance players
Portland Timbers non-playing staff
St. Louis Steamers (original MISL) players
Minnesota Strikers (MISL) players
Scottish expatriate sportspeople in the United States
Scottish expatriate sportspeople in Canada
Ottawa Intrepid players